Sharhabil Ahmed, sometimes also Sharhabeel Ahmed (b. 1935), is a Sudanese popular musician, known for his distinctive style of singing, compositions, oud and guitar playing. Inspired by Western dance music like rock and roll and adding brass instruments to his electric lead guitar, he has been called "The King of Sudanese Jazz". He has composed numerous songs and performed all over Sudan, as well as in Europe, Africa and in the Gulf countries, where large communities of Sudanese exiles reside.

Personal life 
Ahmed's father was a religious man, but the family already owned a phonograph and liked both religious madeeh singing as well as popular haqiba music. In an interview with the Egyptian newspaper Al-Ahram, Ahmed remembered: "My biggest worry was how not to upset my father, who was interested in Sufism, and was fond of madeeh, but felt that music and art distracted me from my studies."

As his father worked as a truck driver, the family frequently moved from one part of Sudan to another. Ahmed grew up in Al-Obeid, the capital of former Kordofan province, in Western Sudan, and eventually enrolled at the College of Fine and Applied Arts in Khartoum, where he studied graphic design. After graduation, he joined the Ministry of Education as an illustrator for textbooks and comics magazines. He worked for several children's magazines, such as Al-Sabian, Maryud and Sabah magazines from 1960, until he retired from the Ministry of Education in 1995.

Sharhabil's wife, Zakia Abdul Gassim Abu Bakr, was the first female guitarist in Sudan, and several of their seven sons and daughters also have become musicians. In 2021, Zakia announced the forthcoming release of an album by her all-female band Sawa Sawa, including bass player Islam Elbeiti.

Musical career 

Before becoming a guitar player, Sharhabil learned to play the oud, saxophone, trombone and trumpet. But it was the electric guitar that eventually became his favourite instrument. His smooth voice, full of vibrato, has added to his distinctive popularity.

"I started out by learning to play the oud and traditional Sudanese music, and got a diploma from the music institute of Khartoum University. But my ambition was to develop something new. For this, the guitar seemed like the best instrument. Western instruments can approximate the scales of Sudanese music very well. After all, a lot of Western music is originally from Africa. I have absorbed different influences, from traditional Sudanese rhythms to calypso and jazz, and I hold them together in my music with no difficulty."

The electric guitar was originally introduced to the Khartoum music scene by musicians from what is now South Sudan, who appreciated the popular guitar sound from their neighbours in the Congo. Congolese music, itself heavily influenced by South American and Caribbean sounds, had an important influence on Sudanese popular music in the 1960s.

In an interview, he recalled his performance on New Year’s Eve 1971 at St. James’ music hall, the most important music venue in Khartoum at the time. During this show, he was called "The King of Sudanese Jazz", a title that has been associated with him ever since.   

Even though he has included saxophones and trumpets, his style of music has not much in common with the Western notion of Jazz music. Rather, Sharhabil’s sound is known as a unique combination of rock, funk, and Congolese music with a typical Sudanese character. Combining his soft vocals with the distinct sound of urban Sudanese music, he and his band became one of Sudan's most sought-after music groups. Over the years of his long career, he has published many songs and albums, available mostly in Sudan. As of 2018, Sharhabil Ahmed was still performing live at select occasions in Khartoum.

In July 2020, Habibi funk, an independent music label based in Germany, re-edited digital versions of some of Sharhabil's songs on the album "The King Of Sudanese Jazz", with the title 'Argos Farfish' and other songs available for free listening. - Announcing this compilation in the Financial Times, music critic David Honigman described the music in the following way:

Discography

 Sharhabil Ahmed on discogs.com
The King Of Sudanese Jazz, CD by Sharhabil Ahmed, 2020

See also 

 Music of Sudan
 List of Sudanese singers

External links
 The King Of Sudanese Jazz - remastered album on YouTube
Bulbultain by Sharhabil Ahmed - music video
 Hirman by Sharhabil Ahmed - music video
 Sharhabil Ahmed and his band live at National Theatre, Omdurman
 Sharhabil Ahmed and his son Shareef: TEDxKhartoum
 Sharhabil Ahmed on Facebook

References

Further reading 

 Nūr al-Dīn, Najīb. (2014). شرحبيل : قراءه في سيرة الابداع والريادة الثقافية  Khartoum. (Biography of Sharhabil Ahmed)

20th-century Sudanese male singers
Sudanese graphic designers
People from Omdurman
1935 births
Living people
Oud players
College of Fine and Applied Art (Khartoum) alumni